Yankeetown is the name of several populated places.

United States
 Yankeetown, Florida
 Yankeetown, Indiana
 Yankeetown, Minnesota
 Yankeetown, Brown County, Ohio
 Yankeetown, Darke County, Ohio
 Yankeetown, Fayette County, Ohio
 Yankeetown, Ross County, Ohio
 Yankeetown, Tuscarawas County, Ohio
 Yankeetown, Tennessee
 Yankeetown, Virginia
 Yankeetown, Wisconsin

Canada
 Yankeetown, Nova Scotia